In potential theory (the study of harmonic function) and functional analysis, Dirichlet forms generalize the Laplacian (the mathematical operator on scalar fields). Dirichlet forms can be defined on any measure space, without the need for mentioning partial derivatives. This allows mathematicians to study the Laplace equation and heat equation on spaces that are not manifolds, for example, fractals. The benefit on these spaces is that one can do this without needing a gradient operator, and in particular, one can even weakly define a "Laplacian" in this manner if starting with the Dirichlet form.

Definition 

where one often discusses  which is often referred to as the "energy" of the function .

More generally, a Dirichlet form is a Markovian closed symmetric form on an L2-space. In particular, a Dirichlet form on a measure space   is a bilinear function

such that
  for every .

In other words, a Dirichlet form is nothing but a non negative symmetric bilinear form defined on a dense subset of  such that 4) and 5) hold.

Harmonic functions 
Functions that minimize the energy given certain boundary conditions are called harmonic, and the associated Laplacian (weak or not) will be zero on the interior, as expected.

Then a harmonic function in the standard sense, i.e. such that , will have  as can be seen with integration by parts.

As an alternative example, the standard graph Dirichlet form is given by:

where  means they are connected by an edge. Let a subset of the vertex set be chosen, and call it the boundary of the graph. Assign a Dirichlet boundary condition (choose real numbers for each boundary vertex). One can find a function that minimizes the graph energy, and it will be harmonic. In particular, it will satisfy the averaging property, which is embodied by the graph Laplacian, that is, if  is a graph harmonic then  which is equivalent to the averaging property  

Technically, such objects are studied in abstract potential theory, based on the classical Dirichlet's principle.

Integral kernels 
Another example of a Dirichlet form is given by

where  is some non-negative symmetric integral kernel.

Thus Dirichlet forms are natural generalizations of the Dirichlet integrals

where  is a positive symmetric matrix. The Euler-Lagrange equation of a Dirichlet form is a non-local analogue  of an elliptic equations in divergence form. Equations of this type are studied using variational methods and they are expected to satisfy similar properties.

References 

.

Markov processes